Sam Costelow (born 10 January 2001) is a Welsh professional rugby union player for Scarlets in the URC. He usually plays Fly Half.

Club career
Born Llantrisant & from Pencoed, Costelow spent time with the Ospreys youth teams before moving on to Leicester Tigers in 2018. Having twice won the Academies League, Costelow earned a place with the Tigers development squad and went on to make loan move to Championship side Ampthill.

In March 2020, Costelow signed with Scarlets.

During the 2022–23 United Rugby Championship season, Costelow became first choice outside half for the Scarlets. He was named as Player of the Match in their 39–7 win over Bayonne in the Challenge Cup.

International career
A Wales youth international at under-16 and under-18 level, Costelow stood out during the 2020 Six Nations Under 20s Championship putting in a Man of the Match performance against England.

Costelow was named in the Wales squad for the 2022 Autumn series.

Following a late team change, Costelow was named on the bench against New Zealand on 5 November 2022, coming on in the second half to make his test debut.

References

External links
Leicester Tigers profile
Scarlets profile
Wales profile

2001 births
Living people
Leicester Tigers players
Rugby union fly-halves
Rugby union players from Llantrisant
Welsh rugby union players
Ampthill RUFC players
Scarlets players
Wales international rugby union players